Willow in the Wind is the fifth studio album by American country music artist Kathy Mattea. It was released in 1989 (see 1989 in country music) on Mercury Records. The album is her highest-peaking entry on the Top Country Albums charts, where it reached number 6. It was also certified gold by the RIAA. Four singles were released from it, and all four reached Top Ten on the Billboard country singles charts. First were the back-to-back number 1 hits "Come from the Heart" and "Burnin' Old Memories", followed by the number 10 "Where've You Been" and number 2 "She Came from Fort Worth". "Where've You Been" also charted on the Hot Adult Contemporary Tracks charts, peaking at number 25 there. This song also earned her the 1990 Grammy Award for Best Female Country Vocal Performance.

Track listing

Personnel
Compiled from liner notes.

Musicians

"Come from the Heart"
 Craig Bickhardt — background vocals
 Pat Flynn — acoustic guitar
 Kenny Malone — percussion
 Kathy Mattea — background vocals
 Donna McElroy — background vocals
 Mark O'Connor — mandolin
 Wayland Patton — background vocals
 Milton Sledge — drums
 Pete Wasner — piano
 Bobby Wood — percussion
 Bob Wray — bass guitar

"Here's Hopin'"
 Stuart Duncan — fiddle
 Ray Flacke — electric guitar
 Chris Leuzinger — acoustic guitar, electric guitar
 Kenny Malone — percussion
 Charlie McCoy — harmonica
 Riders in the Sky — background vocals
 Milton Sledge — drums
 Bob Wray — bass guitar

"Burnin' Old Memories"
 Bruce Bouton — steel guitar
 Mike Chapman — bass guitar
 Ray Flacke — electric guitar
 Chris Leuzinger — acoustic guitar
 Milton Sledge — drums

"She Came from Fort Worth"
 Kathy Chiavola — background vocals
 Pat Flynn — acoustic guitar
 Chris Leuzinger — electric guitar
 Wayland Patton — background vocals
 Milton Sledge — drums
 Pete Wasner — piano
 Bobby Wood — keyboards
 Bob Wray — bass guitar

"True North"
 Pat Flynn — acoustic guitar
 Chris Leuzinger — electric guitar
 Charlie McCoy — harmonica
 Jim Photoglo — background vocals
 Matt Rollings — keyboards
 Milton Sledge — drums
 Wendy Waldman — background vocals
 Bob Wray — bass guitar

"Hills of Alabam'"
 Bruce Bouton — steel guitar
 Pat Flynn — acoustic guitar
 Chris Leuzinger — acoustic guitar
 Claire Lynch — background vocals
 Charlie McCoy — harmonica
 Jim Photoglo — background vocals
 Milton Sledge — drums
 Bobby Wood — piano, organ
 Bob Wray — bass guitar

"Willow in the Wind"
 Kathy Chiavola — background vocals
 Jerry Douglas — Dobro
 Stuart Duncan — mandolin
 Ray Flacke — electric guitar
 Chris Leuzinger — acoustic guitar
 Wayland Patton — background vocals
 Milton Sledge — drums
 Bob Wray — bass guitar

"Love Chooses You"
 Bruce Bouton — steel guitar
 Robert Bowlin — acoustic guitar
 Kathy Chiavola — background vocals
 Pat Flynn — acoustic rhythm guitar
 Wayland Patton — background vocals
 Matt Rollings — piano
 Milton Sledge — drums
 Bobby Wood — piano
 Bob Wray — bass guitar

"I'll Take Care of You"
 Bruce Bouton — steel guitar
 Stuart Duncan — fiddle
 Ray Flacke — electric guitar
 Mike Leech — bass guitar
 Chris Leuzinger — acoustic guitar
 Kathy Mattea — background vocals
 Tim O'Brien — background vocals
 Milton Sledge — drums
 Bobby Wood — keyboards

"Where've You Been"
 Edgar Meyer — upright bass
 John Mock — acoustic guitar
 Dave Pomeroy — bass guitar
 Matt Rollings — piano

Technical
 Mark Miller — recording, mixing
 Denny Purcell — mastering
Allen Reynolds — production

Charts

Weekly charts

Year-end charts

Certifications

Release history

References

Kathy Mattea albums
Mercury Nashville albums
Albums produced by Allen Reynolds
1989 albums